Erik or Eric Larson may refer to:

 Eric Larson (1905–1988), Disney animator
 Erik Larson (author) (born 1954), American author
 Erik Larson (figure skater), former American figure skater
 Erik J. Larson, American computer scientist

See also
Erik Larsen (disambiguation)
 Erik Larsson (disambiguation)